Alexander John DiPersia (born March 6, 1982) is an American actor known for his role in the 2016 horror film Lights Out. DiPersia's first role was a minor cameo in the 2007 survival horror film I Am Legend.

Life and career
DiPersia was raised in Connecticut and New York City, the son of Ronna (Kaufman), an artist, and John DiPersia, a lawyer. His grandfather, Robert Kaufman, was a prominent real estate developer. After attending the Hopkins School in New Haven, he moved to Boston to attend Boston College, where he majored in philosophy. His most recent role is starring in the Warner Brothers horror film Lights Out, alongside Teresa Palmer and Maria Bello. He is also shooting a major recurring role in the Amazon drama series Good Girls Revolt. He stars as a war veteran who attempts to restart his life after being deeply affected by his time in Vietnam. He also starred in a two-part series of short films directed by Diego Luna and Gael García Bernal, titled "Drifting: Part 1" (Luna) and "Drifting: Part 2" (Garcia Bernal), as well as the drama "Thorns", that screened at both the Cannes and Venice Film Festivals.

DiPersia’s additional film credits include a role in I Am Legend, starring Will Smith and An American Carol with Kelsey Grammer. On the small screen, he has appeared on FOX’s Gotham and CBS' NCIS: New Orleans. DiPersia played Marco Vitturi in Lovestruck: The Musical.

DiPersia is also an active member of the New York art world as a collector, curator, and advisor. He builds collections and focuses on interior design as it relates to the art for clients. He has worked for lobbies in New York as well as the permanent collection for the new buildings in New York’s Hudson Yards.

Filmography

References

External links

Living people
American male television actors
American people of Russian-Jewish descent
Italian people of Russian-Jewish descent
20th-century American male actors
21st-century American male actors
American people of Jewish descent
Male actors from New York (state)
1982 births